Shri Devi Talab Mandir is a Hindu Mandir located in Jalandhar, Punjab, India. The temple is devoted to Goddess Durga and is visited by thousands of pilgrims every year. It is regarded as one of the 51 Shakti Pithas in India. Even a model of Amarnath Yatra was constructed sometime back only. Beside the main Devi Talab Mandir, is an old Temple of Goddess Kali. One of the prime attractions of the temple is an old tank, which is considered to be sacred by the Hindu devotees.The temple has a structure resembling the Amarnath Cave temple in Jammu and Kashmir. The Temple has a Gold Work done inside as well as on its Top.

Places of interest
 Ma Durga Murti
 Charitable Hospital
 Amarnath Cave
 Vaishno Devi Cave
 A Pond
 Food Canteen
 Kali Mata Mandir
 Ram Hall
 Hari Vallabh Sangeet Sanmelan

Picture gallery

References

Hindu temples in Punjab, India
Durga temples